Phoxinus ujmonensis is a species of freshwater fish in the family Cyprinidae. It is found in Russia, Kazakhstan, Mongolia, and China.

References

Phoxinus
Fish described in 1899